The Reinberg Lime is a roughly 1,000-year-old lime tree by the village church in Reinberg in the German district of Vorpommern-Rügen.

The age of the lime tree, which has been designated as a natural monument is estimated at about 1,000 years old, which makes the tree considerably older than the neighbouring historic village church. The tree has a height of about 19 metres and a crown diameter of about 17 metres. The girth of the trunk at a height of 1.30 metres is 10.80 metres.

From 1782, following a senate resolution, priests were buried beneath the lime tree rather than being interred in front of the altar as had hitherto been the case. In 1795 the lime was mentioned in the travel diaries of Johann Friedrich Zöllner. He wrote: 
 In 1796 Wilhelm von Humboldt also admired the mighty tree.

Literature 
 Stefan Kühn, Bernd Ullrich, Uwe Kühn: Unsere 500 ältesten Bäume. BLV, Munich, 2009, p. 38.

See also 
 Kaditz Lime Tree

External links 

Individual lime trees
Individual trees in Germany
Natural monuments in Mecklenburg-Western Pomerania